Sarvisé is a locality located in the municipality of Broto, in Huesca province, Aragon, Spain. As of 2020, it has a population of 100.

Geography 
Sarvisé is located 81km north-northeast of Huesca.

References

Populated places in the Province of Huesca